James R. "Jim" Lloyd, Jr. (January 27, 1950 - August 18, 1989) was an American politician from Pennsylvania who served as a Democratic member of the Pennsylvania State Senate for the 5th district from 1979 until 1984.

He died of brain cancer on August 18, 1989, while serving as an aide to Pennsylvania Governor Robert P. Casey  He is interred at the Holy Sepulchre Cemetery in Cheltenham, Pennsylvania.

References

1989 deaths
1950 births
20th-century American politicians
Burials at Holy Sepulchre Cemetery
Deaths from brain tumor
Democratic Party Pennsylvania state senators
Politicians from Philadelphia